Juan Hernández Sierra (born March 16, 1969) is a retired amateur boxer from Cuba, who competed in the welterweight (< 67 kg) division during the 1990s. He represented his native country at three consecutive Summer Olympics, starting in 1992 in Barcelona, Spain. After having won silver at his Olympic debut he repeated that feat in Atlanta, United States (1996).

Four times he became world champion in his division, in 1991, 1993, 1995 and 1999.

Olympic results
1992
 Defeated Said Bennajem (France) 6-0
 Defeated Jin-Chul Jun (South Korea) RSC 2
 Defeated Soren Antman (Sweden) RSC 3
 Defeated Aníbal Acevedo (Puerto Rico) 11-2
 Lost to Michael Carruth (Ireland) 10-13
1996
 Defeated Jozsef Nagy (Hungary) RSC 2
 Defeated Vadim Mezga (Belarus) 12-2
 Defeated Nurzhan Smanov (Kazakhstan) 16-8
 Defeated Marian Simion (Romania) 20-7
 Lost to Oleg Saitov (Russia) 9-14
2000
 Defeated Stephan Nzue Mba (Gabon) RSC 3
 Defeated Mohamed Salad Marmouri (Tunisia) RSC 3
 Lost to Yermakhan Ibraimov (Kazakhstan) 9-16

External links
 Juan Hernández at databaseOlympics.com
 
 
 

1969 births
Living people
Welterweight boxers
Boxers at the 1991 Pan American Games
Boxers at the 1992 Summer Olympics
Boxers at the 1996 Summer Olympics
Boxers at the 1999 Pan American Games
Boxers at the 2000 Summer Olympics
Olympic boxers of Cuba
Olympic silver medalists for Cuba
Olympic medalists in boxing
Cuban male boxers
AIBA World Boxing Championships medalists
Medalists at the 1996 Summer Olympics
Medalists at the 1992 Summer Olympics
Pan American Games gold medalists for Cuba
Pan American Games medalists in boxing
Central American and Caribbean Games gold medalists for Cuba
Competitors at the 1990 Central American and Caribbean Games
Competitors at the 1993 Central American and Caribbean Games
Central American and Caribbean Games medalists in boxing
Medalists at the 1991 Pan American Games
Medalists at the 1999 Pan American Games
People from Pinar del Río Province
20th-century Cuban people